Jean Chantavoine (17 May 1877 – 16 July 1952) was a French musicologist and biographer and the secretary general for the Conservatoire national supérieur de musique.

Chantavoine was born in Paris.  He published numerous books and articles, including biographies of Beethoven, Liszt, Saint-Saëns and Mozart.

In 1933, he revealed the existence of Bizet's Symphony in C, housed in the library of the Conservatoire, in an article in the French periodical Le Ménestrel.  Chantavoine also was the first to publish many of Beethoven's manuscript sketches and letters, for example in his 1903 Correspondance de Beethoven.  He died, aged 75, in Mussy-sur-Seine.

References

External links
List of Books by Jean Chantavoine Google Books

Writers from Paris
1877 births
1952 deaths
French male non-fiction writers
French biographers
20th-century French musicologists